Victoria Falls is a waterfall on the southern side of Loch Maree in Wester Ross in the north-west of Scotland. It is on the Abhainn Garbhaig, a short river that flows from Loch Garbhaig to Loch Maree. The falls are within Slattadale Forest, owned by the Forestry Commission.

See also
Waterfalls of Scotland

References

Waterfalls of Highland (council area)
Ross and Cromarty